Trần Chí Công is a Vietnamese football defender who plays for Vietnamese V-League club Bình Dương F.C. Tran Chi Cong was once called up to Vietnam national football team in 2008.

References

External links

1984 births
Living people
Vietnamese footballers
Vietnam international footballers
Becamex Binh Duong FC players
V.League 1 players
People from Cần Thơ
Association football defenders